George Gatehouse (20 June 1864 – 25 January 1947) was an Australian cricketer. He played fourteen first-class matches for Tasmania between 1883 and 1900.

See also
 List of Tasmanian representative cricketers

References

External links
 

1864 births
1947 deaths
Australian cricketers
Tasmania cricketers
Cricketers from Hobart